Queluz Sintra Património Mundial is a professional basketball team based in Queluz, Portugal. The team plays in the Proliga Portugal. The team was active in the Portuguese LCB until 2007. That year, the team withdrew from the highest level. In the 2005–06 season, Queluz participated in the ULEB Cup.

Achievements
Portuguese Basketball League: 2
1983–84, 2004–05
Portuguese Basketball Cup: 2
1982–83, 2004–05
Portuguese Basketball Super Cup: 2
1984, 2005

Notable players

 Ângelo Victoriano
 Aníbal Moreira
 Ike Nwankwo
 Carlos Andrade
 Miguel Miranda 
 Carlos Lisboa

Basketball teams in Portugal